Bernard (between 1358 and 1364 – 11 June 1434, in Celle), Duke of Brunswick-Lüneburg, ruled over several principalities of Brunswick-Lüneburg. In the genealogy of the House of Welf, he is considered the first member of the Second House of Lüneburg.

Bernard was the second son of Magnus II, Duke of Brunswick-Luneburg. After the death of his father in 1373, he and his brothers agreed with the Ascanian dukes of Saxony-Wittenberg to alternate rule in the Principality of Lüneburg. From 1375 on, Bernard took part in the government de jure, and from 1385 on de facto.

After their oldest brother, Frederick, had been murdered in 1400, Bernard and his brother Henry went on a revenge campaign against the Archbishopric of Mainz and the County of Waldeck, since the archbishop of Mainz was the suspected instigator of the murder plot, and the count of Waldeck performed the deed.

Bernard and Henry ruled the Principality of Brunswick together after Frederick's death; in a treaty of 1409, Bernard received sole rule over Brunswick. After a second treaty in 1428, Bernard switched to the Principality of Lüneburg.

Family
Bernard married Margaret, daughter of Wenceslaus, Elector of Saxony, in 1386. They had three children:
Otto (died 1446)
Frederick (died 1478)
Catherine (died 1429), married Casimir V, Duke of Pomerania

References
Braunschweigisches Biographisches Lexikon, Appelhans 2006, 
Allgemeine Deutsche Biographie, vol. 2, p. 416-418

14th-century births
1434 deaths
Princes of Lüneburg
Princes of Wolfenbüttel
Year of birth uncertain
Middle House of Lüneburg